Ratarda flavimargo is a moth in the family Cossidae. It is found on Labuan and in Brunei.

Adults have pinkish grey wings with black markings between the veins  which grade to yellow.

References

Natural History Museum Lepidoptera generic names catalog

Ratardinae
Moths described in 1925